Jeti-Ögüz is a village located at the north slope of Teskey Ala-Too mountain range near Issyk Kul in the Jeti-Ögüz District of Issyk-Kul Region of Kyrgyzstan.  Its population was 4,143 in 2021.

History
The thermal springs of Jeti-Ögüz were known to local inhabitants since antiquity.  The place became known to Europe after 1856 when Semenov-Tian-Shanskii first visited it.  Since 1965 the resort operates year-round.  In 1991, an important meeting between Boris Yeltsin and Askar Akayev took place in Jeti-Ögüz.

References

Issyk-Kul Region